Lunda Sul Province is not to be confused with Luanda Sul, a satellite city of Luanda, the capital of Angola.

Lunda Sul ("South Lunda") is a province of Angola. It has an area of 77,637 km² and a 2014 census population of 537,587. Saurimo is the provincial capital.

Geography and climate
It is bordered to the north by Lunda Norte Province, to the east by the Democratic Republic of the Congo, to the south by Moxico Province and southwest by Bié Province, and to the west by Malanje Province. The main road from Luanda to Lubumbashi traverses the province from west to east.

The province is dominated by dry savannah land; only in the Kasai River valley are there remnants of tropical rainforest. The Kasai forms the eastern and southern frontier of Lunda Sul and is the main river of the province. The Kwango River is also a major river of the province. The climate of the province is predominantly tropical.

Municipalities
The province of Lunda Sul contains four municipalities:

 Cacolo
 Dala
 Muconda
 Saurimo

Communes
The province of Lunda Sul contains the following communes; sorted by their respective municipalities:

 Cacolo Municipality: – Alto-Chicapa (Alto-Chikapa), Cacolo, Cucumbi (Kukumbi), Xassengue
 Dala Municipality: – Cazage (Cazeje), Dala, Luma Cassai
 Muconda Municipality: – Cassai Sul (Kassai Sul), Chiluage, Muconda, Muriege (Murieje)
 'Saurimo Municipality: – Mona-Quimbundo (Mona-Kimbundo), Saurimo, Sombo

Economy and social issues
Economically the province is dominated by peanut cultivation, which is operated primarily in the Saurimo area. In the south of the province maize production is major contributing factor. Other agricultural products include rice, cassava and cereals. This region is rich with diamonds, manganese and iron which are exploited; Catoca mine in Lunda Sul Province is the fourth largest diamond mine in the world. Due to warfare in the region, at times mining has been disrupted by attacks form the UNITA, especially in 1999-2000.
In spring 1999, UNITA destroyed the bridge on the Kasai River at Biula, affecting transport communications in the region between Lunda Sul and Moxico.

Like in many other areas of Angola, landmines are a serious problem, and it is described as being "severely mined". As of 1995, some 30 major or strategic bridges and 58 secondary bridges had been destroyed in the province according to Oxfam reports. "Forced return and restrictions to freedom of movement" by people has been noted in the province, and the Huambo and Cuando Cubango provinces.

Demographics

The origin of the province's population belongs to the ethnic groups of the Lunda and Chokwe people, which are closely connected historically. They are mainly involved in agriculture. There are also many immigrants from other parts of the country, working for the Endiama or as independent diamond miners. The struggle between the Lunda and Chokwe to obtain wealth from the diamond industry has increased tension in the province.

List of governors of Lunda Sul

References

External links

 Official website of province governor
 Information on this province at the Angolan ministry for territorial administration
 Information on this province at Info Angola
 Province geographical info at geoview.info

 
Provinces of Angola